The Sacred Heart Language College is a Roman Catholic secondary school for girls located in Wealdstone, London, England.

History
Sacred Heart High School was founded in 1907 by the Sisters of St Chretienne who had fled religious persecution in their native France. The school taken over by the Sisters of Notre Dame des Missions in 1920 after the founding order returned to France. It was originally a boarding school for girls, although a small number of boys were admitted into the kindergarten. After World War I, the school, as with many Catholic schools in the country, faced financial struggles but remained open after much effort from pupils and staff to raise the necessary funds.

In 1957 it became a voluntary aided grammar school. In 1991 the first lay headteacher was appointed after long-serving headteacher Sister Anne Collette retired. During the 1990s, the school went through a tumultuous period during which pupil numbers and GCSE scores plummeted, coupled by a poor Ofsted inspection report in 1994. The appointment of Mary Waplington as headteacher in 1997 turned the school's fortunes around. It gained Language College specialist status in 2003 and was renamed The Sacred Heart Language College. In 2005 an Ofsted report deemed it to be very good. The appointment of Miss Geraldine Higgins as headteacher in 2007 ushered in a new phase with outstanding Ofsted judgements recorded in both 2008 and 2014. The 2013 Diocesan report on how well it fulfils its Catholic mission deemed it to be outstanding for both its teaching and spirituality.

The Sacred Heart Language College converted to academy status in May 2019 and is now sponsored by the Blessed Holy Family Catholic Academy Trust.

References

External links
School Website

Catholic secondary schools in the Archdiocese of Westminster
Girls' schools in London
Secondary schools in the London Borough of Harrow
Academies in the London Borough of Harrow
Educational institutions established in 1907
1907 establishments in England
Specialist language colleges in England